Bill Dow is an actor, director and writer in theatre, film, and television. He is best known for playing Bill Lee in the Stargate franchise.

Career

He also had a recurring roles as Russ Hathaway in the Canadian drama series Da Vinci's Inquest, as Mr. Parkman in Pasadena, Dr. Charles Burks in The X Files, and Dr. Veet in the film, Absolute Zero. Bill Dow has played many other guest star and recurring roles in a variety of television series such as Kyle XY and feature films, and has directed several award-winning theater productions for the Vancouver Playhouse where he was Artistic Associate for many years.

As an actor Dow has performed many lead roles, including a 2004 Jessie Award-winning performance as Martin Dysart in Peter Shaffer's Equus. He served as associate artistic director at the Blyth Festival and the Belfry Theatre, and resident dramaturge at the Banff Playwrights Colony.
Bill Dow also played a part in the 2015 Film Autumn Dreams as the driver of Ben.

Personal life
Dow completed his interdisciplinary PhD in Theatre and Classical Mythology at Simon Fraser University in 2013. His studies included an examination of Greek tragedy and the writing of a 'new' tragedy – Cupid's Arrow, that tells the beginnings of the story of Jason and Medea – a prequel to Euripides' Medea. He maintains an active acting and directing career while teaching Theatre and Mythology at Simon Fraser University.

References

External links 
 

Year of birth missing (living people)
Living people
Canadian male television actors
Canadian theatre directors